Mid Lanarkshire was a county constituency of the House of Commons of the Parliament of the United Kingdom (Westminster) from 1885 to 1918. It elected one Member of Parliament (MP) by the first past the post voting system.

Boundaries 

The name relates the constituency to the county of Lanark. The Redistribution of Seats Act 1885 provided that the Mid division was to consist of "the parishes of Rutherglen, Carmunnock, so much of the parish of Cathcart as adjoins the two last-mentioned parishes, Cambuslang, Blantyre, so much of the parish of Hamilton as lies south and west of the River Clyde, Dalserf and Cambusnethan".

Members of Parliament

Elections

Elections in the 1880s

Mason's resignation caused a by-election.

Elections in the 1890s

Elections in the 1900s

Elections in the 1910s

General Election 1914–15:

Another General Election was required to take place before the end of 1915. The political parties had been making preparations for an election to take place and by the July 1914, the following candidates had been selected; 
Liberal: John Howard Whitehouse
Unionist: 
Labour: Robert Smillie

References

See also 
 1888 Mid Lanarkshire by-election

Historic parliamentary constituencies in Scotland (Westminster)
Lanarkshire
Constituencies of the Parliament of the United Kingdom established in 1885
Constituencies of the Parliament of the United Kingdom disestablished in 1918